Santa Cruz Coast Athletic League (SCCAL) a high school athletic conference part of the CIF Central Coast Section of the California Interscholastic Federation.  It comprises high schools generally around Santa Cruz County, California.  Not all schools participate in all sports.

Members
 Aptos High School
 Harbor High School	
 Mt. Madonna High School
 San Lorenzo Valley High School	 
 Santa Cruz High School
 Scotts Valley High School
 Saint Francis Central Coast Catholic High School
 Soquel High School

References

CIF Central Coast Section